Axenus is a monotypic moth genus of the family Noctuidae. Its only species, Axenus arvalis, is found in the US states of California and Oregon. Both the genus and species were first described by Augustus Radcliffe Grote in 1873.

References

Acronictinae
Monotypic moth genera